Francisco 'Paco' Antonio Candela Pascual (born 19 January 1993) is a Spanish footballer who plays for Real Balompédica Linense. Mainly a central defender, he can also play as a defensive midfielder.

Club career
Born in Alicante, Valencian Community, Candela graduated with Villarreal CF's youth setup, and made his senior debuts with the C-team in the 2011–12 campaign, in Tercera División. On 20 August 2013 he moved to Segunda División B's CD Leganés, featuring in 29 matches during his first season, which ended in promotion.

On 6 August 2014 Candela signed a new two-year deal with the Madrid side. On 11 September he made his professional debut, starting in a 1–1 home draw against CD Numancia, for the campaign's Copa del Rey.

On 16 January 2015 Candela was loaned to Sevilla Atlético, until June. He subsequently returned to Lega after his loan expired and scored his first professional goal on 23 August, netting his team's first in a 2–3 away loss against UD Almería through a free kick.

Candela joined Mérida AD on 3 January 2020. However, after only one game for the club, Paco got problems with his knee and was out for the rest of his spell at the club. In the summer 2020, Paco then signed with Linense. After four games for the club, he hurt his knee again at the end of November 2020 and underwent a arthroscopy to repair the external meniscus of his right knee, in which he suffered a partial tear. Paco was set to be out for two months.

References

External links

1993 births
Living people
People from Alicante
Spanish footballers
Footballers from the Valencian Community
Association football defenders
Segunda División players
Segunda División B players
Tercera División players
CD Leganés players
Sevilla Atlético players
CF Fuenlabrada footballers
Hércules CF players
Mérida AD players
Real Balompédica Linense footballers
CF Intercity players